Didiévi is a town in central Ivory Coast. It is a sub-prefecture of and the seat of Didiévi Department in Bélier Region, Lacs District. Didiévi is also a commune.

In 2014, the population of the sub-prefecture of Didiévi was 22,510.

Villages
The 27 villages of the sub-prefecture of Didiévi and their population in 2014 are:

References

Sub-prefectures of Bélier
Communes of Bélier